Washington Park is a census-designated place (CDP) in Gila County, Arizona, United States. The population was 70 at the 2010 United States Census.

Geography
Tonto Village is located in northern Gila County in the valley of the upper reaches of the East Verde River, just below (south of) the Mogollon Rim.

Demographics

References

Census-designated places in Gila County, Arizona
Census-designated places in Arizona